David Jones (9 April 1914 – 28 July 1998) was an English cricketer.  Jones was a right-handed batsman with a bowling style of fast medium.  He was born at Hodthorpe, Bolsover,  Derbyshire.

Jones made his first-class debut for Nottinghamshire against Yorkshire in 1935 County Championship.  He made 23 further first-class appearances for the county, the last of which came against Derbyshire in the 1939 County Championship.  In his 24 first-class appearances, he scored 594 runs at an average of 18.00, with a high score of 60.  This score, which was one of two fifties he made, came against Worcestershire in 1938.  He took a single first-class wicket, that of Somerset captain Bunty Longrigg.

He died at Scarborough, Yorkshire on 28 July 1998.

References

External links
David Jones at ESPNcricinfo
David Jones at CricketArchive

1914 births
1998 deaths
People from Bolsover
Cricketers from Derbyshire
English cricketers
Nottinghamshire cricketers